Jack Ashford (born May 18, 1934), known to his friends as Jashford, is an American musician widely known as the percussionist for Motown Records' in-house Funk Brothers band during the 1960s and early 1970s. Ashford is most famous for playing the tambourine on hundreds of Motown recordings. With the death of Joe Messina in April 2022, Ashford is the last surviving member of the Funk Brothers.

Instruments he is known to have played are the tambourine, vibraphone, marimba, maracas, cabasa, bells, chimes, bell tree, finger cymbals, kazoo, triangle, wood block, handclaps, foot stomps and hotel sheet.   His definitive performance is on "War" by Edwin Starr.  Other notable songs Ashford played tambourine on include "Nowhere to Run" by Martha & the Vandellas, "You Can't Hurry Love" by The Supremes, "I Heard It Through the Grapevine" by Marvin Gaye, and "Don't Leave Me This Way" by Thelma Houston.   He played vibes, shakers, and the marimba on Motown recordings such as The Miracles' "Ooo Baby Baby".

In the 1960s and 1970s, Ashford worked closely with singer and songwriter Lorraine Chandler, setting up Pied Piper Productions, and working with her on her own records and those of other musicians in Detroit such as Eddie Parker.

Ashford moved to Los Angeles in the mid-1970s.  The early 1980s saw production work from Ashford but it proved to be the end of his career in music. However, in 2014, he made a recent appearance on The Secret Sisters' second album Put Your Needle Down.

He is not known to be related to famed singer-songwriter Nick Ashford, who also worked for Motown Records.

Session work
The Mighty Clouds of Joy - Kickin''' - ABC Records, 1975 - (percussion)
The Mighty Clouds of Joy - Live and Direct - ABC Records, 1977 - (hotel sheet, percussion)

Footnotes

References

Ashford, Jack (2003). Motown: The View From The Bottom''. Bank House Books.

External links

 Bankhousebooks.com
Jack Ashford Interview NAMM Oral History Library (2013)

African-American drummers
American soul musicians
1934 births
Living people
The Funk Brothers members
Musicians from Philadelphia
American percussionists
Musicians from Detroit
Tambourine players
Maracas players
Triangle players
Tubular bells players
American vibraphonists
American marimbists
Women marimbists
20th-century American drummers
American male drummers
20th-century American male musicians
20th-century African-American musicians
21st-century African-American people